A design specification is a detailed document that sets out exactly what a product or a process should present. For example, the design specification could include required dimensions, environmental factors, ergonomic factors, aesthetic factors, maintenance that will be needed, etc. It may also give specific examples of how the design should be executed, helping others work properly (a guideline for what the person should do).

Example of a design specification 
An example design specification is shown below. Columns and information may be adjustable based on the output format (may be a physical product, or software, etc.)

See also
 Data sheet (Spec sheet)
 Design by contract
 Software requirements specification
 Specification

References

Mohan, S., Dr. "Design Specifications." Dr. S. Mohan. N.p., n.d. Web. 27 Dec. 2015.
"What Are Specifications?" Specificationsdenver. N.p., n.d. Web. 27 Dec. 2015.

Product development